Gingidiobora nebulosa, the gingidium looper moth, is a moth in the family Crambidae. It is endemic to New Zealand. This species has been classified as Nationally Vulnerable by the Department of Conservation.

Taxonomy
This species was first described by Alfred Philpott in 1917 and named Xanthorhoe nebulosa. Philpott used specimens collected in February and March at The Bluff, Waiau Toa / Clarence River and at Coverham, Marlborough by Dr. J. A. Thomson and Hugh Hamilton. George Vernon Hudson described and illustrated the species in 1928. In 1987 Robin C. Craw placed this species within the genus Gingidiobora. The type specimen is held at Museum of New Zealand Te Papa Tongarewa.

Description
The larvae are green and smooth.

Philpott described the adults of the species as follows:

Distribution
G. nebulosa is endemic to New Zealand. As well as its type locality of Coverham and The Bluff, Clarence River, this species has been found at the Tone River bed and at Ka Whata Tu o Rakihouia Conservation Park in Marlborough. It is also present at Macraes Ponds in Waitaki, and in Otago.

Biology and life cycle
The larvae feed at night. The species is most commonly seen in March.

Host plant
The larvae of G. nebulosa feed on mountain carrot, Gingidia montana. This plant suffers from browse reduction which in turn affects the moth population.

Conservation status
This species has the "Nationally Vulnerable" conservation status under the New Zealand Threat Classification System.

References

External links

Image of type specimen

Larentiinae
Moths described in 1917
Moths of New Zealand
Endemic fauna of New Zealand
Endangered biota of New Zealand
Endemic moths of New Zealand